The Darling of Paris (French: Paris Béguin) is a 1931 French drama film directed by Augusto Genina and starring Jane Marnac, Jean Gabin and Jean-Max. It was one of the first films to portray Gabin in his characteristic 1930s setting of pessimistic working class settings.

Cast
 Jane Marnac as Jane Diamond 
 Jean Gabin as Bob 
 Jean-Max as Dédé 
 Charles Lamy as L'auteur 
 Pierre Finaly as Le producteur 
 Saturnin Fabre as Hector 
 Rachel Bérendt as Gaby 
 Fernandel as Ficelle 
 Pierre Mayer as Beausourire 
 Violaine Barry as Simone

References

Bibliography 
 Higbee, Will & Leahy, Sarah.  Studies in French Cinema: UK Perspectives, 1985-2010. Intellect Books, 2011.

External links 
 

1931 films
French drama films
French black-and-white films
1931 drama films
1930s French-language films
Films directed by Augusto Genina
Films scored by Maurice Yvain
1930s French films